Diego Drajer (born 26 March 1974) is an Argentine fencer. He competed in the individual sabre event at the 2000 Summer Olympics.

References

External links
 

1974 births
Living people
Argentine male sabre fencers
Pan American Games bronze medalists for Argentina
Olympic fencers of Argentina
Fencers at the 2000 Summer Olympics
Pan American Games medalists in fencing
Fencers at the 2007 Pan American Games
21st-century Argentine people